, Laff has current or pending affiliation agreements with television stations in 168 media markets encompassing 46 states, including Washington, DC (including stations in the top 13 markets), covering 90% of the United States.

Charter affiliates included all 8 ABC Owned Television Stations and 13 E.W. Scripps Company stations. The two initial deals gave Laff affiliate clearances in 35% of all U.S. markets, and 13 of the 30 largest television markets (including New York City, Los Angeles, Chicago, Denver, Detroit, and Houston). On March 13, 2015, Katz Broadcasting announced an affiliation deal with the Cox Media Group to carry Laff on seven of its stations (including WSB-TV in Atlanta and WFXT in Boston), expanding its initial reach to 47% of the country; the following week on March 20, as part of a multi-network affiliation agreement with Katz, the Meredith Corporation announced that it would carry the network on its stations in Portland, Oregon (KPTV) and Hartford (WFSB).

Laff is also available on Univision Communications and Entravision Communications stations until 2024.

Affiliates

List of current affiliates
This is the current list of affiliates for Laff as of September 17, 2022. Owned and operated stations are in bold.

List of former affiliates

References